= Chatham Islander =

Chatham Islands newspaper (1992–2020)

Chatham Islander was a monthly newspaper published in the Chatham Islands. It was published from April 1992 to March 2020.

== History ==
The Chatham Islands published several newspapers over the course of the 19th and 20th centuries. The predecessor to the 1992 publication was The Chatham Islander, a newsletter, but the Chatham Island Enterprise Trust, its owner, did not want to enter the publishing business. A new publication began in April 1992, whose owner and editor was Graham C. Elliot, of Napier, who owned Courier in that city, and had contacts in the Chathams. John Hart took over in April 2006; then to Rosemary Jackson (now Graham) of Christchurch in 2010.

The newspaper's final issue in March 2020 made no reference of its shutdown. In May 2024, Rosemary Graham told Radio New Zealand's Mediawatch that the first lockdown of the pandemic led to its permanent closure. Up until then, the newspaper was viable thanks to support from locals. The islands are still served by a newsletter, as of 2024.
